Clapton Road railway station served the town of Clapton in Gordano, Somerset, England from 1907 to 1940 on the Weston, Clevedon and Portishead Railway.

History 
The station opened on 7 August 1907 by the Weston, Clevedon and Portishead Railway. All it had was a sign and a cattle grid; there were no platforms or shelters. The station closed on 20 May 1940.

References

External links 

Disused railway stations in Somerset
Railway stations opened in 1907
Railway stations closed in 1940
1907 establishments in England
1940 disestablishments in England
Railway stations in Great Britain opened in the 20th century